Sir Richard Combe ( 1632 – living 1675) of Hemel Hempstead, was knighted by the Lord Protector Oliver Cromwell during the Interregnum and again shortly after the Restoration by Charles II.

Biography
Richard Combe was the son of Tobias Combe, of Felmeston-Bury, Hertfordshire,  and Mary, daughter of John Theede of Crofton Com. Buckinghamshire.

Combe was knighted by the Lord Protector Oliver Cromwell at Whitehall in August 1656. This honour passed into oblivion with the Restoration of the monarchy under Charles II in May 1660, however Charles bestowed a new knighthood on Sir Richard on 5 February 1661. During the Interregnum Sir Richard a supporter of the Parliamentary cause prospered, but after the Restoration his fortunes waned and he died poor.

Family
Combe married twice. His first wife was Anne daughter and coheir of John Frere of Stroke Suffolk.  They had two sons:
Richard (1654–1692).
Thomas (born 1656 – before 1692).
Combe married secondly Anne daughter of —— Trowe of ——, Oxfordshire.

Ancestry

Notes

References

Further reading

People from Hemel Hempstead
Year of birth uncertain
People of the English Civil War
1675 deaths